The Song of the Lark is a novel by American author Willa Cather, written in 1915. It is her third novel to be published.

The book tells the story of a talented artist born in a small town in Colorado who discovers and develops her singing voice. Her story is told against the backdrop of the burgeoning American West in which she was born in a town along the rail line, of fast-growing Chicago near the turn of the twentieth century, and of the audience for singers of her skills in the US compared to Europe. Thea Kronborg grows up, learning herself, her strengths and her talent, until she reaches success.

The title and first edition cover art comes from an 1884 painting of the same name by Jules Breton, part of the collection of the Art Institute of Chicago.

Plot introduction

Set in the 1890s in Moonstone, a fictional town in Colorado, The Song of the Lark is the self-portrait of an artist in the making. The ambitious young heroine, Thea Kronborg, leaves her hometown to go to Chicago to fulfill her dream of becoming a well-trained pianist, a better piano teacher. When her instructor hears her voice, he realizes that this is her true artistic gift. He encourages her to pursue her vocal training instead of piano saying, "your voice is worth all that you can put into it. I have not come to this decision rashly" (Part II, Chapter 7). In that pursuit she travels to Dresden, then to New York City, singing operas. Her reference for life is always her home town and the people she encountered there.

The novel captures Thea's independent-mindedness, her strong work ethic, and her ascent to her highest achievement. At each step along the way, her realization of the mediocrity of her peers propels her to greater levels of accomplishment, but in the course of her ascent she must discard those relationships which no longer serve her.

Plot summary

Part I: Friends of Childhood
In Moonstone, Colorado, Doctor Archie helps Mrs. Kronborg give birth to her son, Thor. The Doctor takes care of their daughter, Thea, who is sick with pneumonia. The next year Thea goes to the Kohlers for piano lessons with Wunsch and practices daily for two hours (or four hours if school is not in session). The doctor goes to Spanish Johnny who is sick. Later, Ray Kennedy goes out to the countryside with Johnny, his wife, Thea, Axel, and Gunner. Although she is only twelve and he is thirty, Ray dreams of marrying her when she is old enough. They tell stories of striking it rich in silver mines in the west.

Before Christmas, Thea plays the piano at a concert, but the town paper praises her rival Lily which upsets Thea, as she wanted to sing rather than perform an instrumental piece. Tillie turns down the local drama club's notion to have Thea play a part in The Drummer Boy of Shiloh, knowing that acting is not her niece's talent. After Christmas, Wunsch tells Thea about a Spanish opera singer who could sing an alto part of Christoph Willibald Gluck. She sings for him. He says she needs to learn German for many of the good songs. Wunsch gets so drunk that he behaves badly and hurts himself. Ten days later, all of his students discontinue their lessons with him, and he leaves the town. Shortly after, Thea drops out of school and takes up his students; at fifteen she begins to work full-time.

Thea and her mother enjoy a trip to Denver on Ray's freight train, riding in the caboose. They stop for lunch with the station agent at a town along the way. That fall, Mr. Kronborg insists that Thea help at the Wednesday prayer meeting by playing the organ and leading the hymns, and she does. At fifteen, religion perplexes Thea, as typhoid kills her schoolmates and a local tramp, the source of the infection, is made to leave town; she wonders if the Bible tells people to help him instead. Dr. Archie tells her that people have to look after themselves. On the way from Moonstone to Saxony, Ray's train has an accident and the next day he bids an emotional goodbye to Thea before he dies. After the funeral, Dr. Archie informs Mr. Kronborg that Ray has bequeathed six hundred dollars to Thea for her to go to Chicago and study music there. Her father agrees to let her go despite her only being seventeen.

Part II: The Song of the Lark
In Chicago, Thea settles close to the parish of a Swedish Reformed Church with two German women. She sings in the choir and in funerals for a stipend, and she takes piano lessons with Mr. Harsanyi. When Mr. Harsanyi learns Thea sings in a church choir, he asks her to sing. He is very impressed by her voice. Later, he meets with the conductor of the Chicago Orchestra and asks him who is the best voice teacher in the area; it is Madison Bowers. He then parts with Thea, explaining that her voice is her true artistic gift, not her playing. After several weeks of singing lessons, she takes a train back to Moonstone for her summer vacation. She has grown. She goes to a Mexican ball with Spanish Johnny and sings for them, feeling the pleasure of the audience for the first time. Back in her house, Anna reproaches her for singing for them and not their father's church. She returns to Chicago in the fall.

Part III: Stupid Faces
In Chicago, Thea moves from one home to another. She takes daily singing lessons, spending the afternoons as accompanist for Bowers' more accomplished students. She grows tired of them, not all people like the warm and  intelligent Harsanyis. Fred Ottenburg shows up for lessons, a man who is educated, lively and closer to her age than all her male teachers. He introduces her to the Nathanmeyers, a Jewish family who loves operatic music and her style of singing. They invite her to sing at their musical evenings, helping her with proper dress. Thea catches an infection and does not fully recover; she needs a break in her familiar desert setting but will not return to her family until she has accomplished something. Fred suggests that she spend the summer on a ranch in Arizona where there are some of the cliff homes of the ancient peoples that Thea has longed to see.

Part IV: The Ancient People
Thea gets off the train at Flagstaff, Arizona, seeing the San Francisco Peaks to reach the Bitmer home. She recoups her health, with days in the canyon, resting in one of the ancient cliff dwellings, while sharing the meals of Mr. and Mrs. Bitmer. She comes to know herself better in the moments of isolation. Ottenburg joins her in July. After much direct conversation, they kiss. They take refuge from a severe storm, and then make a daring trek back to the ranch in the dark, met by Bitmer with a lantern. They talk of what is next; Thea thinks she is in love and considers marrying him. Fred suggests a visit to Mexico City, before getting her to Germany, where he feels she belongs, for her singing. Ottenburg does not tell her he married eight years earlier, though he and his wife have been estranged for most of those years, keeping up appearances.

Part V: Doctor Archie's Venture
In Denver, Dr. Archie receives a telegram from Thea summoning him to New York City and asking him to lend her money so that she can study singing in Germany. Fred told Thea about his marriage in Mexico City, and Thea accepts it, but makes it clear the limits his first marriage imposes on them. She tells Archie about this.  In New York she tells Fred that she will leave and will not accept his financial help. Archie goes to dinner with Ottenburg and Thea. The next day, Fred leaves to tend his dying mother. Thea ponders the risks of her ambition, realizes she is young, just 20, and heads to Germany.

Part VI: Ten Years Later
Ten years after Thea leaves for Germany, Dr. Archie lives in Denver after his mining investments succeed and his wife has died. His life is better. He was involved in politics but is now tired of it. He wants to go to New York City, as does Fred, where Thea is performing. He has not seen her in ten years. Four years after she left for Germany, Thea's father died of disease and Mrs. Kronborg began to fail without him. Thea ached to go home to her mother, but opportunity opened in the opera company in Dresden for her before she could go home. Dr. Archie tries to keep Mrs. Kronborg's spirits up, but she dies. Thea has paid back the loan to Dr. Archie already.

In  New York City, Thea performs at the Metropolitan Opera House. Dr. Archie and Fred are there to attend her performance. The three are good friends. Fred is still tied to his wife, who has been in a sanitarium for the last seven years; but he pines to raise a son. Thea is asked to replace an ill singer at the last minute, and she performs very well. Thea is then announced to sing the entire role of Sieglinde, in the program. This role is well-suited to her voice. Besides Archie and Fred, two other people from her past are in the audience—Harsanyi, her teacher from Chicago, and Spanish Johnny, the Mexican mandolin player from Moonstone, who all deeply enjoy her performance, as does the entire audience. In the epilogue, Tillie Kronborg is in Moonstone, enjoying her niece's successes in the opera. She recalls hearing the famous Kronborg when the opera travelled to Kansas City, and she is happy.

Characters
Moonstone
 Thea Kronborg: the protagonist. As the novel begins, she is eleven years old in Moonstone, Colorado. After studying in Chicago, she becomes a renowned opera singer in Dresden and New York City.
 Doctor Howard Archie:  the young town doctor in Moonstone. He is a lifelong friend of Thea, who gives her financial support, which she in her turn repays. After he is widowed, his investments in silver mines pay off handsomely so he moves to Denver.
 Mrs. Archie: Doctor Archie's wife, born Belle White. She met her husband in Lansing, Michigan. She is a dull, penny-pinching woman. She dies in a house fire that she likely caused while using an unsafe cleaning product. The fire burned the house completely, about four years after her husband sees Thea in New York City.
 Larry: Doctor Archie's errand boy.
 Reverend Mr. Peter Kronborg: Father of seven children, including Thea. He is a Methodist minister. He was born in a Scandinavian colony in Minnesota, and went to school in Indiana.
 Mrs. Kronborg: Wife of Peter and wise mother of Thea, who understands what is due to her daughter's talent.
 Anna: Thea's older sister, who becomes a devout Methodist. The two sisters are not much alike.
 Thor Kronborg: Newborn when the story begins, and eleven-year-old Thea often cares for him. When Dr. Archie lives in Denver, Thor repairs and drives his automobile, as his chauffeur. He was born waiting for the automobile to be invented, per Dr. Archie.
 The Kronborg children: namely  Gus (clerk in a drygoods store, age 19), Charley (works in a feed store, age 17),  Anna (the elder daughter, in high school), Thea (pronounced Tay a, age 11), Axel (age 7), Gunner, and Thor (the baby, pronounced Tor).
 Aunt Tillie Kronborg: Unmarried sister of Reverend Kronborg who lives with her brother's family. She is 35 years old. She lives in Moonstone at the end of the novel, and looks happily back over Thea's singing career.
 Professor A. Wunsch: a music teacher in Moonstone, perhaps 50 years old, short and stocky, who recognizes Thea's talent. He lives with the Kohlers for a few years, then roams to another town. Dr. Archie sees him as a man with a drinking problem. He has taught in St Louis and Kansas City.
 Spanish Johnny: a harness maker in Mexican Town in Moonstone. He had been a painter and decorator in Trinidad, Colorado before moving to Moonstone. He plays the mandolin. His full name is Juan Tellamantez. He is present in the audience when Thea has her outstanding performance in New York City.
 Mrs. Tellamantez: Johnny's wife, after whose death, her husband becomes a travelling musician.
 Famos Serrenos: Spanish Johnny's cousin. He works in a mine in Moonstone.
 Mrs. Paulina Kohler: She comes from the Rhine Valley and speaks little English. Her sons are grown and working for the railroad, travelling. She has a magnificent garden in dry Moonstone, with fruit trees, a grapevine, European linden trees, vegetables and flowers. She tends to Herr Wunsch's clothes, so he is respectable as a music teacher.
 Mr. Fritz Kohler: Husband of Paulina, and the local tailor, who enjoys a drink with Herr Wunsch.
 Mrs. Smiley, a millinery shop keeper.
 Billy Beemer: an old drunkard who died while playing with a switch engine.
 Ray Kennedy: Freight train conductor, age 30, and friend of the Kronborg family. On his days off, he takes Thea on outings to noteworthy places easily reached by horse and cart, especially the sand mountains. He wants to marry Thea, but dies in a train wreck before she is old enough.
 Joe Giddy: Ray's brakeman, who enjoyed the trip with Thea and her mother, but a few years later he failed to set out warning flares at the rear when the freight train was stopped to take on water, mistakenly trusting his ears to hear any train coming. Thus was Ray Kennedy killed in the stopped train.
 Mrs. Livery Johnson: a Baptist and a member of the Woman's Christian Temperance Union. She is the wife of the owner of the livery stable, hence the nickname, and president of a committee in the Moonstone Orchestra. She learned to play the piano in Grinnell, Iowa.
 Lily Fisher: Thea's young rival in Moonstone at a multi-church Christmas concert.
 Upping: a jeweller, the 'trainer' of the drama club in Moonstone.
 Mr. Carsen: Local carpenter in Moonstone.

Last summer in Moonstone
 Maggie Evans: a girl from Moonstone who dies the day before Thea returns from her winter in Chicago. Thea at first refuses to sing at her funeral until her mother persuades her it is the right thing to do.
 Miguel Ramas: a Mexican from Moonstone. He has two young cousins, Silvo age 18 and Felipe age 20. They dance often with Thea at the Mexican Ball.
 Mrs. Miguel Ramas: Mother of Miguel Ramas.
 Famos Serrenos: a bricklayer.

Chicago
 Reverend Lars Larsen: a friend of Mr. Kronborg in Chicago, who takes Thea on for paid church and funeral singing, and recommends her to a family where she could stay.
 Hartley Evans: a friend of Dr. Archie's, a throat specialist in Chicago, who directs them to Harsanyi.
 Andor Harsanyi: Concert pianist of Hungarian background, age 32 at the start of grand career, and teacher for Thea in Chicago, and the first artist she meets. He ran from his home in Hungary as a boy, because his father pushed him too hard on his music. His wife is not yet thirty and very much likes Thea. They have a son, Andor 6 years old, and  a daughter, Tanya, 4 years old, when Thea meets them. They move to New York City during Thea's second season in Chicago, so Andor can take on the students of a retiring music teacher there, and then live in Vienna. He returns to New York City and performs in Carnegie Hall. He sees Thea on the opera stage for his first time, years after teaching her.
 Mrs. Lorch: a German parishioner in Chicago, in whose home Thea spends her first winter in Chicago.
 Mrs. Irene Andersen: Mrs. Lorch's widowed daughter. She sings in the Mozart society in Chicago. Her husband Oscar had been Swedish, so she keeps to the Swedish church.
 Mr. Eckman: one of Mrs. Lorch's lodgers. He works in a slaughterhouse in Packingtown, which Thea tours with him, wanting to see where all the animals that passed through Moonstone were sent.
 Theodore Thomas: Conductor of the Chicago Symphony Orchestra with whom Harsanyi consults as to the best singing teacher in Chicago for Thea.
 Madison Bowers: a singing teacher in Chicago. He is well-qualified but a rather unpleasant man.
 Miss Adler: Accompanist for Madison Bowers, who is "an intelligent Jewish girl from Evanston, Illinois."
 Hiram Bowers: Father of Bowers, and a choirmaster in Boston.
 Mrs. Priest: A popular singer in Chicago, also taking lessons from Bowers, whose voice lacks the qualities that Bowers teaches to Thea. She bothers Thea, and disappoints her, for low general knowledge, as well as singing style. Mrs. Harsanyi advises Thea to forget about her, the same advice Bowers gives, so she will focus on her own voice.
 Jessie Darcey: A soprano singer training under Bowers who is soon to go on tour, singing songs that Harsanyi taught to Thea in her first winter. Thea thinks Darcey is not very good in her singing, as she tells Mrs Harsanyi, who says, what does it matter how the others are doing?
 Mr. Philip Frederick Ottenburg or Fred Ottenberg: Scion of a beer magnate. He went to Harvard and has a particularly engaging personality. He loves opera and likes to sing himself, but not professionally. He connects with Thea, understanding her stages of development in both understanding her talent and pursuing her career. At least by Aunt Tillie's description in the Epilog, he is Thea's husband when the opera tours in Kansas City.
 The Nathanmeyers: Wealthy Jewish family in Chicago, friends with the Ottenburgs and lovers of the music that Thea sings. They host music parties, for which they hire her to perform, after Fred introduces them.
 Katarina Furst Ottenburg: Mother of Fred Ottenburg, of the St. Louis brewery family.
 Henry Biltmer: He lives on Ottenburg's ranch in northern Arizona.
 Mrs. Biltmer, Henry Biltmer's wife. She cooks meals for her husband, Thea and Ottenburg after the days spent in the ancient cliff dwellings.
 Dick Brisbane: a friend of Ottenburg from Kansas City, who asked Fred to meet his fiancée as she shopped for her trousseau, an unfortunate request all around.
 Edith Beers: Ottenburg's wife. Soon after the marriage, she lives in Santa Barbara, unwilling to give Fred a divorce. She was originally engaged to Dick Brisbane. A bit later, she lives in an asylum, still binding Fred to her because of the laws protecting her. Her family is owner of a large Kansas City brewery.
 Alphonse: the hansom driver for Ottenburg and Edith in New York City in their very brief courtship years earlier.

Denver
 Captain Harris: The friend and financier who loans Dr. Archie cash in Denver so he in turn can bring cash to Thea in New York.
 Thomas Burk: Dr Archie's assistant in Denver, at San Felipe mining.
 Jasper Flight: an undaunted prospector who never finds silver, but Dr. Archie will give him another stake.
 Pinky Alden: the governor that Doctor Archie helped get elected.
 Tai: Doctor Archie's Japanese servant in Denver.
 Therese: Thea's maid.

New York City
 Mr. Oliver Landry: An accompanist and singer. He grew up near Cos Cob, later inherits a home from his aunt in New York, and helps Thea whilst in Germany and New York City. He is a link to Fred, letting him know which roles Thea will perform.
 Madame Necker: a successful opera singer.
 Nordquist: a singer Thea nearly marries in Europe, mentioned in discussion between Thea and Fred in New York City.

Allusions to other works
 Literature: Nikolaus Lenau's Don Juan, Lord Byron ('My native land, good night', 'Maid of Athens', 'There was a sound of revelry', Childe Harold's Pilgrimage), Virgil-Ovid, Honoré de Balzac's A Distinguished Provincial at Paris [Un grand homme de province à Paris], Samuel Taylor Coleridge's The Rime of the Ancient Mariner, Hugh Reginald Haweis, Oliver Wendell Holmes, Sr., Walter Scott's Waverley Novels, Washington Irving, Thomas Paine's The Age of Reason, Robert Burns, William Cullen Bryant's Thanatopsis, Hans Christian Andersen's "The Snow Queen," William Shakespeare's Hamlet, and Jules Verne.
 Music and the performing arts: Fay Templeton, Carl Czerny, Jenny Lind, Claudia Muzio, Clementi, Carl Reinecke, Maggie Mitchell, Johann Strauss II's The Blue Danube, Ludwig van Beethoven, Frédéric Chopin, Johann Sebastian Bach, Robert Schumann, Johann Nepomuk Hummel, Antonín Dvořák, Henriette Sontag, Clara Morris, Helena Modjeska, Charles Gounod's Ave Maria, Gaetano Donizetti's Lucia di Lammermoor sextet, John Philip Sousa, Gustav Mahler, Richard Wagner's Tannhäuser and Der Ring des Nibelungen, Ignacy Jan Paderewski; Gluck's Orfeo "Che faro, senza Euridice" (Italian); "Ach, ich habe sie verloren" (German)
 The Bible: Tower of Babel, Noah's Ark, Jephthah, Rizpah, 'David's lament for Absalom', and Mary Magdalene.
 The visual arts: Jean-Baptiste-Camille Corot, Barbizon school, Dying Gaul, Venus de Milo, Jean-Léon Gérôme, Henri Rousseau, Édouard Manet, Anders Zorn, and the painting that inspired the title of the book, The Song of the Lark by Jules Breton, part of the collection of the Art Institute of Chicago.
 Performance venues: Weber and Fields Music Hall.

Allusions to history and real places
 Historical figures such as Napoleon III, George Washington, William H. Prescott, Robert G. Ingersoll, Julius Caesar, and Cato the Younger are mentioned.
 Lars Larsen's parents are said to have moved from Sweden to Kansas thanks to the Homestead Act.
 Fred Ottenberg speaks to Gustav Mahler after he conducts an opera in which Thea sings the part of one of the Rhinemaidens.
 Although Moonstone is a fictional small town at the end of a rail line in Colorado, most other cities and towns are real, like Denver, Chicago in the fast growing 1890s, Evanston, Illinois a suburb of Chicago, and Dresden in Germany. The mountainous and usually arid land in Colorado where Thea was born and places she visits with Ray are real places. In Chicago, Thea often visits the Art Institute of Chicago, which was a significant museum in the time she lived there; its first collection in 1879 was plaster casts of famous sculptures. The new building with the lions out front was built in 1893 at the time of the World's Columbian Exposition, by which time the collections of paintings had greatly expanded. The caves of the ancient peoples, the Anasazi, who predate the Pueblo tribes in northern Arizona, living in cliff-side homes in the canyons where pieces of their pots and arrowheads are found in the soil, where she stayed for a summer, are real places. The San Francisco Peaks she sees as a main landmark are sacred to the Navajo people. Thea mentions Canyon de Chelly, now Canyon de Chelly National Monument, which is located in northern Arizona.

Literary significance and criticism
 The novel was inspired by the story of soprano Olive Fremstad.
 Christopher Nealon has argued that Thea is more boyish than girlish. In the Panther Canyon episode, he links her rapport with Fred to Eve Kosofsky Sedgwick's theory of homosociality.
 This novel is one of the first of the Revolt Novels, a term coined by Carl Van Doren in his article in The Nation titled "Revolt from the Village". This is a style of writing that turns the focus away from rural life as idyllic and focuses on a more real-to-life view of the rural, one that has a conservative, hegemonic and parochial bent, uses the trope of gossip as currency, and a power structure that is more complex than what was evident in the published works of earlier small-town-idyll writers. Revolt from the Village authors wrote from 1915 until the early 1930s and included Edgar Lee Masters, Spoon River Anthology (1915), Willa Cather, Song of the Lark (1915), Sherwood Anderson, Winesburg, Ohio (1919), Sinclair Lewis, Main Street (1920) and Mary Hunter Austin, A Woman of Genius (1921).

Adaptations

The novel was adapted for television as part of Season 30 of Masterpiece Theatre, airing May 11, 2001.

References

External links

 
 
 First Edition at the Willa Cather Archive
 
 

1915 American novels
American autobiographical novels
Novels by Willa Cather
Novels set in Colorado
Novels set in Chicago
Novels set in Arizona
Novels set in New York City
Novels set in the 1890s
Novels about music